Vasyl Skybenko is a retired Soviet and Ukrainian football player.

Career
Vasyl Skybenko was born in the village of Korolivka, and started playing football at SDYUSHOR Dynamo Kyiv. He started performing on football fields in 1995 as part of the Dynamo-3 Kyiv amateur team, and in the 1997–1998 season he played for Ukrainian Second League.

The following season, he moved to Borysfen, from Boryspil city. In 1999, he became a player of the team of Prykarpattia Ivano-Frankivsk in Ukrainian Premier League, however, in the first season of the new season, he played exclusively as part of Prykarpattia-2 Ivano-Frankivsk, which played in Ukrainian Second League. As part of the main team of the Prykarpattia Ivano-Frankivsk club, Skibenko started playing at the beginning of the 2000–2001 season, when the team was already playing in the first league, and became the main goalkeeper. In 2002, the football player joined the team of the second league Desna Chernihiv from Chernihiv city, in which he spent two seasons.

At the beginning of the 2004–2005 season, Vasyl Skybenko returned to the Spartak Ivano-Frankivsk, which at that time played under the name "Spartak", but this time he was not the main goalkeeper of the team, playing only 16 matches for the Spartak Ivano-Frankivsk.

Skibenko started the next season as part of Borysfen, which at that time had already reached the first league, and played in it until the end of 2006, playing 27 championship matches. The football player spent the second half of the 2006–2007 season as part of another team of the first league Helios Kharkiv from Kharkiv, for which he played 7 matches, and in the second half of 2007 he played for the first league club from Crimea Feniks-Illichovets Kalinine, in which he played only 3 matches. In 2017 he moved to Vorskla Poltava, where he played 13 matches.

At the beginning of the 2009–2010 season, Skybenko became a player of Nyva Vinnytsia, and won a ticket to the first league with it. He played in the Vinnytsia team until the end of 2010, and during 2011 he played in  amateur team Putrivka in the AAFU championship, and became the winner of the Oleh Makarov Memorial Tournament.

At the beginning of 2012, the football player joined the team of the second league Yednist' Plysky from the village of Plysky, and after the elimination of the team from the professional league, he played in it until 2015. In 2018 he moved to amateur teams Patriot until the end of 2021, becoming the oldest player and he become the best goalkeeper of the championship of the Kyiv region.

Honours
Nyva Vinnytsia
 Ukrainian Second League: 2009–10

Vorskla Poltava
 Ukrainian Cup: 2008–09

References

External links 
 
 Vasyl Skybenko upl.ua

1978 births
Living people
Soviet footballers
Association football goalkeepers
FC Dynamo-3 Kyiv players
FC Borysfen Boryspil players
FC Prykarpattia-2 Ivano-Frankivsk players
FC Prykarpattia Ivano-Frankivsk (1998) players
FC Desna Chernihiv players
FC Spartak Ivano-Frankivsk players
FC Helios Kharkiv players
FC Vorskla Poltava players
FC Feniks-Illichovets Kalinine players
FC Nafkom Brovary players
FC Nyva Vinnytsia players
FC Yednist Plysky players
Ukrainian Second League players
Ukrainian First League players
Ukrainian Amateur Football Championship players